George Alan Westwater (born 26 March 1946) is an Australian former footballer. He was named in the Football Federation Australia's "Team of the Decade" for the period 1963-1970 as a midfielder.

Biography
Westwater was born in Bridge of Allan in Scotland. His father Willie was a footballer for Morton F.C. in the Scottish First Division. The Westwaters moved to Australia in 1957 when Willie transferred to Bankstown in Sydney.

Playing career
In 1962, as a 16-year-old, he made his debut for Canterbury-Marrickville in the New South Wales State League as an active right-side midfielder. During his first season both he and his father played in the state league.

In 1963 the Canterbury club raised £500 to enable the 17-year-old Westwater to try his luck in Scotland for the 1963–64 season. A condition imposed by the club was that Westwater had to play with them on his return to Sydney for two years. He tried out with the Rangers but ended up signing with Stirling Albion on 31 August 1963. After three seasons he returned to Sydney, Australia to play for Pan Hellenic.

International career 
His composure in midfield and willingness to join in attack earned Westwater his international debut for Australia in 1967 against Scotland. He scored his first international goal against Singapore in November 1967 and scored his second goal ten days later against Singapore again. He played the last of his 14 international matches in April 1968 against Japan in Adelaide.

Honours
In December 2013 Westwater was named in the Football Federation Australia "Team of the Decade" for the period 1963–1970.

References

1946 births
Australian soccer players
Australia international soccer players
Scottish footballers
Sydney United 58 FC players
Stirling Albion F.C. players
Living people
Association football midfielders